The Mountain West Conference women's basketball tournament is the conference championship tournament in women's basketball for the Mountain West Conference. It is a single-elimination tournament involving all of the 11 league schools, and seeding is based on regular-season records with head-to-head match-up as a tie-breaker. The winner receives the conference's automatic bid to the NCAA women's basketball tournament.

In the first round, the #8 seed plays the #9 seed, the #7 seed plays the #10 seed, and the #6 seed plays the #11 seed, with the 3 top seeds (ranked by conference record) play the winners of those respective games, while the #4 and #5 seed play each other. The winners of the four games play each other in the Semifinals, and the winner of those two games play off against each other to determine the champion.

Results

Champions

Air Force, Nevada, San José State, and Utah State have not yet won a Mountain West tournament.
TCU never won a Mountain West tournament as a conference member.
 Schools highlighted in pink are former members of the Mountain West.

See also
 Mountain West Conference men's basketball tournament

References

 
Recurring sporting events established in 2000